Christian Mathias Cullen (born 12 February 1976) is a retired New Zealand rugby union player. He played most of his rugby at fullback for New Zealand (the All Blacks), for the Hurricanes in the Super 12, and for Manawatu, Wellington and later Munster at provincial level. He was nicknamed the Paekakariki Express and was considered to be one of the most potent running fullbacks rugby has ever seen. With 46 tries scored in 58 tests, Cullen is the 9th-highest try-scorer in international rugby.

Youth and early career

Cullen was born in Paraparaumu and grew up in Paekākāriki, a small town north of Wellington. He is the youngest of three children. He has an elder twin brother named Shane and a sister named Anita. Cullen is of Irish descent; he also has Samoan and German ancestry.

His rugby talent emerged in his high school years and he was selected in the New Zealand secondary schools team in 1993 and 1994. He played senior rugby for Manawatu in 1995 and scored 70 points through 12 tries, two conversions and two penalty goals. He was selected to the New Zealand sevens squad for tournaments in Fiji and Hong Kong.

Professional career 
Cullen's provincial career started in 1994 season for Horowhenua-Kapiti. In 1996 he played in the first-ever Super 12 game, contested by the Hurricanes and the Blues. That year he scored seven tries in nine matches.

At the 1996 World Sevens competition in Hong Kong he scored 18 tries, including seven in one match. Later that year he was selected as an All Black. He scored seven tries in his first two Test matches: a hat-trick on debut against Samoa and four tries against Scotland. He sustained a knee cartilage injury on the All Blacks' tour to South Africa.

In 1997 Cullen returned from injury and scored 11 tries in 10 games for the Hurricanes, and 12 tries in 12 Test matches for the All Blacks.

The All Blacks had a poor year in 1998 with five consecutive losses, but Cullen scored four tries in seven matches. He represented New Zealand in rugby sevens at the Kuala Lumpur Commonwealth Games, playing seven games, scoring nine tries and kicking 23 conversions. New Zealand won the tournament and the gold medal.

In 1999 Cullen was a member of New Zealand's unsuccessful Rugby World Cup squad. He played six matches in the Cup tournament, starting five at centre which was not his preferred position. In 2000 he scored 10 tries in 11 games for the Hurricanes and seven tries in four Tri Nations Tests, including three consecutive pairs.

In 2001 Cullen sustained a severe knee injury that required surgery and an intensive recovery programme. He made himself unavailable for the All Blacks' 2001 end-of-year tour, but was announced 'dropped' by coach John Mitchell at a NZRU press conference. Cullen and Mitchell's personal differences went unresolved over time. Cullen was selected to and dropped from the All Blacks squad throughout 2002. He scored four tries in the five Test matches that year.

In the 2003 Super season Cullen scored eight tries in 12 games for the Hurricanes, taking his Super Rugby career tally to 56, a record at the time. He was briefly and controversially selected for the Māori rugby team, despite having, according to his father, about 1/64th Māori ancestry. He was left out of New Zealand's 2003 World Cup squad. He played out the NPC season for Wellington and received a standing ovation after the Championship final, despite Wellington's losing to Auckland.

Later career and retirement 

At the end of 2003 Cullen moved to Ireland, after he was dropped by John Mitchell, where he played for Munster. His time with Munster was blighted by injuries, particularly to his shoulder, limiting his appearances. His last match for Munster was a 15–7 Celtic League win over the Newport Gwent Dragons at Musgrave Park on 28 April 2007. Two weeks later, on 12 May, he announced his retirement from rugby and stated his intention of returning to New Zealand to start a business.

Records

Cullen is the All Blacks' second-highest try-scorer in the Tri Nations Series with 16, second only to Richie McCaw. He was the first player to score a try in every Tri Nations test in one season. He is New Zealand's second most-capped test fullback. At the time of his retirement he was the All Blacks' leading try-scorer with 46; that record has since been overtaken by Doug Howlett. He scored over 150 tries while playing in New Zealand. He is the third-highest try-scorer in Super Rugby with 56 tries, behind Joe Roff and Howlett.

Biography

His biography, Christian Cullen: Life on the Run (by John Matheson) was released in October 2003. The book received attention particularly for Cullen's criticism of John Mitchell.

See also 
 List of international rugby union tries by Christian Cullen

References

External links
 
 Christian Cullen | Rugby Database Profile
 
 Munster profile
 

New Zealand rugby union players
Rugby union fullbacks
1976 births
Living people
New Zealand international rugby union players
New Zealand sportspeople of Samoan descent
New Zealand people of German descent
New Zealand people of Irish descent
People from Paraparaumu
Hurricanes (rugby union) players
Munster Rugby players
Commonwealth Games gold medallists for New Zealand
Māori All Blacks players
Wellington rugby union players
Manawatu rugby union players
Horowhenua-Kapiti rugby union players
New Zealand expatriate rugby union players
New Zealand expatriate sportspeople in Ireland
Expatriate rugby union players in Ireland
New Zealand international rugby sevens players
New Zealand male rugby sevens players
People educated at Kapiti College
Commonwealth Games rugby sevens players of New Zealand
Commonwealth Games medallists in rugby sevens
Rugby sevens players at the 1998 Commonwealth Games
Medallists at the 1998 Commonwealth Games